Mónika Sánchez (born Mónika Analia Sánchez Torre on 3 December 1974 in Mexico City, Mexico) is a Mexican actress.

Early life
Sánchez was born on 3 December 1974 in Mexico City. She is the daughter of Mexican writer and poet, Fernando Sánchez-Mayans and Angela Torre. 

Moreover, she started acting and modeling at the Miami Community College and The Play House. This was when she realized that her main focus would be acting, so she then enrolled in the "Taller Artistico de Sergio Jimenez" at Televisa in Mexico City. Finally, Sánchez auditioned to be part of the CEA (Centro Educativo Artístico de Televisa), and began studying acting, TV techniques, theater, literature, English, dance, singing, culture, and many other arts. She began her career by doing castings, looking for opportunities, searching for producers and meeting them, and attending events where she could meet important people that could contribute to her future career as an actress.

Career
Sánchez debuted in the 1992 telenovela Ángeles sin paraíso where she had a small participation. Then other opportunities followed:  Buscando el paraíso, Corazón Salvaje, Caminos cruzados, Alondra,  Lazos de Amor, Morir dos veces and Tú y yo.
Sánchez starred as an antagonist in the telenovela Pueblo chico, infierno grande. The popularity of Sánchez for viewers, grew fast; and soon she was one of the most admired female antagonist in Mexíco. The mixture of sweetness and seduction that had not been seen before in a female antagonist, made her performances special and well-liked by viewers. She continued with great success again in antagonist roles in telenovelas: El diario de Daniela and Laberintos de pasión.

In 2000, TVyNovelas Awards recognized her as the Best Female Antagonist of the Year 2000 for her excellent work. In 2001, Sánchez played in the telenovela Salomé in the role of a fragile woman who dies for love. In 2003, she played in the telenovela La Otra; and 2004, Apuesta por un amor as the main antagonist and again in "La mariposa", that gave her another nomination as Best Female Antagonist of the Year 2005 in TVyNovelas Αwards, and followed two other appearances in the telenovela Amar sin límites in 2006 and Al diablo con los guapos in 2007.

After an absence in telenovelas for 4 years, she reappeared in  Amores Verdaderos, produced by Nicandro Diaz Gonzalez, in the role of Cristina Balvanera Corona de Arriaga, with Eduardo Yáñez, Erika Buenfil, Sebastian Rulli and Marjorie de Sousa. In 2013, Sanchez had a special appearance in the telenovela Libre para amarte with singer Gloria Trevi, Gabriel Soto, and Eduardo Santamarina.  In 2014 she played Gisela Cienfuegos in the telenovela La gata.  Later in 2016-2017 she played Viridrina Betancourt in Tres veces Ana.

Personal life
Sánchez in September 2008 she married the Venezuelan businessman Otto Seijas. They have three children: Santiago (born 2009), Angela Fernanda (born November 11, 2011) and Monika Constanza (born November 17, 2013).

Filmography

Theater

Awards and nominations 

Female Revelation Theatrical Journalists Association
Revelation Youth Award 2001
Mar Cruz Olivier Award

References

External links

1969 births
Living people
Mexican telenovela actresses
Mexican television actresses
Mexican stage actresses
Actresses from Mexico City
People from Mexico City
20th-century Mexican actresses
21st-century Mexican actresses